Keewatin is a Cree word meaning "Blizzard of the North" and can refer to the following:


Places

Canada
 Keewatin, Ontario, a town amalgamated with the towns of Kenora and Jaffray Melick to form Kenora
 District of Keewatin, Northwest Territories
 Keewatin Region, Northwest Territories, partially overlapped the District of Keewatin, but was a distinct entity
 Keewatin Region, Nunavut, an alternative name for Kivalliq Region

United States
 Keewatin, Minnesota, a city
 Keewaydin, Minneapolis, Minnesota, a neighborhood in Minneapolis

Other uses
 Diocese of Keewatin, a former Anglican Church of Canada diocese
 Keewatin Air, an airline that operates from Rankin Inlet, Nunavut, Canada
 Keewatin Community College, former name of University College of the North
 Keewatin ice sheet, one of the four major ice centers of the Laurentide Ice Sheet
 Keewatin Railway a First Nations-owned shortline in northern Manitoba
 Keewatin Region (disambiguation)
 SS Keewatin, a Canadian Pacific Railway steamship
 Vicariate Apostolic of Keewatin, a Roman Catholic missionary jurisdiction